İmamqulubəyli or Imamkulubeyli or Imankulubeyli or İmanqulubəyli may refer to:
İmamqulubəyli, Agdam, Azerbaijan
İmamqulubəyli (village), Agdam, Azerbaijan
İmamqulubəyli, Aghjabadi, Azerbaijan
İmamqulubəyli, Barda, Azerbaijan